Jérémy Damien Blasco (born 12 February 1999) is a French professional footballer who plays as either a central defender or a right back for Spanish club SD Huesca.

Club career
Born in Bayonne, Blasco began his career with hometown side Aviron Bayonnais at the age of five, before joining Real Sociedad's youth setup in 2010. He made his senior debut with the C-team on 11 March 2017, starting in a 1–0 Tercera División away win against Deportivo Alavés B.

Blasco scored his first senior goal on 1 October 2017, netting the C's second in a 3–2 home win over Alavés B. He first appeared with the reserves on 17 March 2019, playing the full 90 minutes in a 0–1 away loss against Gimnástica de Torrelavega in the Segunda División B.

On 1 July 2020, Blasco renewed his contract until 2022, and contributed with 15 appearances during the campaign as Sanse achieved promotion to Segunda División. He made his professional debut on 14 August 2021, starting in a 1–0 home win over CD Leganés.

Blasco and his teammate Xeber Alkain left Sanse on 30 May 2022, with their contract expiring in the following month. On 8 July, he moved to second division side SD Huesca on a two-year deal.

References

External links

1999 births
Living people
Sportspeople from Bayonne
French footballers
Association football defenders
Segunda División players
Segunda División B players
Tercera División players
Real Sociedad C footballers
Real Sociedad B footballers
SD Huesca footballers
French expatriate footballers
French expatriate sportspeople in Spain
Expatriate footballers in Spain
Footballers from Nouvelle-Aquitaine